Crew chief may refer to:

 Crew Chief, the in-flight aircraft maintenance technician with various aircrew duties and responsibilities in a military aircraft.
Crew chief, the lead official in a basketball game
 Crew chief, the leader of the pit crew in NASCAR pit stops
 Crew chief, the most experienced baseball umpire in a crew
 Crew Chief, the real-time vehicle location and maintenance tracking application in the Ford Sync in-car entertainment